Republican Left of Catalonia–Sovereigntists (ERC–Sobiranistes) is an electoral coalition formed in Catalonia for the April 2019 Spanish general election by Republican Left of Catalonia (ERC) and Sovereigntists (Sobiranistes). It was led by Oriol Junqueras, Gabriel Rufián and Carolina Telechea, with a member from Sobiranistes (Joan Josep Nuet) being reserved 4th place in the list for Barcelona.

The alliance was maintained for the November 2019 general election.

History
Following the split of the Sobiranistes faction within Catalunya en Comú in February 2019 by deputies Elisenda Alamany and Joan Josep Nuet, ERC entered in coalition talks with the new party ahead of the April 2019 Spanish general election. An alliance was formalized in March, with the agreement providing for Sobiranistes to field candidates within ERC's list for Barcelona. The alliance was maintained for the November 2019 general election.

The alliance was extended to the 2019 Barcelona City Council election in support of Ernest Maragall's bid to the mayorship of Barcelona.

Composition

Electoral performance

Cortes Generales

Nationwide

Regional breakdown

Notes

References

2019 establishments in Catalonia
Catalan nationalist parties
Political parties established in 2019
Political parties in Catalonia
Political party alliances in Spain
Republican Left of Catalonia
Socialist parties in Catalonia